The Citizens' Action Party (commonly abbreviated as PAC) is a political party in Costa Rica.

Its platform is based on encouraging citizen participation and involvement in politics. One of its guiding ideals is to fight against corruption, arguing that it is one of the main causes of underdevelopment and voter apathy. The party took a leading role in the failed campaign against Costa Rica's membership of the Central American Free Trade Agreement.

History and elections

Founding and 2002 election

PAC was founded in December 2000 by several dissidents from Costa Rica's two traditional parties, the National Liberation Party and the Social Christian Unity Party. Originally an anti-corruption party, it startled the Costa Rican political arena with a very strong showing in the 2002 general elections.  In the presidential vote, party founder and candidate Ottón Solís was able to secure 26% of the votes – an unprecedented amount for a third party in Costa Rica – and force a runoff between the PLN and PUSC.

The party won 21.9% of the popular vote and 14 out of 57 seats in the Legislative Assembly, making it the third strongest political force in the legislature.  A few months later, however, after a series of internal disputes, six of the party's 14 deputies resigned from the party, leaving PAC with only eight seats.

2006 election

In the February 5, 2006 parliamentary election, the party won 17 out of 57 seats. Ottón Solís ran for president again, losing to the PLN's Oscar Arias Sanchez by less than 2% of the votes. Arias only won by a few thousand votes over the 40 percent threshold required to avoid a runoff.  The number of spoiled ballots was larger than the margin between Solís and Arias.

After the 2006 election, Ótton Solís took a year away from politics to teach in the United States. Former PLN Secretary General Luis Guillermo Solís' name began being circulated at meetings of the "ungroup," an informal gathering of PAC officials, led by former deputy Alberto Salom. Several PAC officials wanted Luis Guillermo Solís to run as a deputy in San José and as a vice presidential candidate in 2010.

Future President Luis Guillermo Solís joined the party in 2009. and attended meetings of the "ungroup" shortly thereafter in anticipation of the 2014 election.

2010 election

In the 2010 election, Ottón Solís ran for his third and final time as president. Laura Chinchilla of the PLN won, but Ottón Solís finished with 25.2% of the votes. PAC won the second fraction in the Legislative Assembly with 11 deputies elected. Six candidates won municipal elections in the rural communities of Aserrí, Matina, Hojancha, Cañas, Los Chiles y Guatuso.

2014 election

In 2013, PAC held its second national convention. It was an open convention in which any citizen could vote, despite party affiliation. Four candidates vied for the primary to represent PAC in the 2014 national elections: Epsy Campbell Barr, Juan Carlos Mendoza, Luis Guillermo Solís, and Ronald Solís Bolaños, with Luis Guillermo Solís winning 35% of the votes.

On 6 April 2014, Luis Guillermo Solís became the president elect of Costa Rica. PAC candidates won 13 seats in the Legislative Assembly.

2018 election

The third national convention was held between only two candidates, both former ministers on PAC's first cabinet; Minister of Economy Welmer Ramos and Minister of Labor Carlos Alvarado. Ramos was an economist, more socially conservative and close to the "ottonista" faction, whilst Alvarado was writer and political scientist, much more socially liberal and younger, close to the "progresista" faction. Alvarado won the primary election becoming PAC's first time candidate during government.

Despite suffering from a diminished popularity due to the Cementazo scandal affecting the image of Luis Guillermo Solis' government, Alvarado's progressive positions boost him into the second round as a counter-reaction after the growth of Evangelical Christian singer and ultra-conservative candidate Fabricio Alvarado after the backlash against the IACHR's ruling ordering the country to legalize same-sex marriage, winning by a wide margin in the second round with 60% of the votes and more than 1,300,000 votes over the 39% and around 800,000 votes of his rival, becoming the second time that the party achieved more than a million votes in second round.

Platform
While cleaning up corruption has been one of PAC's main goals since its creation, Solís has added to the party's platform. He wants to build infrastructure, bolster Costa Rica's universal health care and social security systems and push for environmentally friendly policies. Historically, PAC has opposed free trade agreements such as CAFTA, which Solís claims is improperly implemented. In addition, PAC claims that the country's tax system is inadequate, saying that a more progressive system is needed.

International relations
PAC is a member of the Progressive Alliance. It maintains informal relations with other progressive and social democratic parties. Ottón Solís has independently met with Ricardo Lagos of the Socialist Party of Chile during a visit to Costa Rica, Cristina Fernández, and members of the Democratic Party of the United States.

Controversies

Estafa cases 
The party was affected in 2016 by a conviction for irregular handling of funds when treasurer Maynor Sterling and an official of the headquarters named Bolaños were found guilty of trying to collect from the Supreme Elections Court for goods and services donated by adherents of the party. The conviction carried a fine of 500 million colones and jail terms for the two involved. In December 2020, the PAC resorts to requesting donations to pay the debt for fraud to the State.

Members

2010–2014 Mayors

Other notable members of PAC

Electoral performance

Presidential

Parliamentary

References

External links
Official website 

2000 establishments in Costa Rica
Anti-corruption parties
Christian socialist organizations
Citizens' Action Parties
Political parties established in 2000
Political parties in Costa Rica
Progressive parties
Social democratic parties in North America